Binibining Pilipinas 1993 was the 30th edition of Binibining Pilipinas. It took place at the Araneta Coliseum in Quezon City, Metro Manila, Philippines on March 21, 1993.

At the end of the event, Elizabeth Berroya crowned Dindi Gallardo as Binibining Pilipinas Universe 1993, Marilen Espino crowned Ruffa Gutierrez as Binibining Pilipinas World 1993, while Joanne Alivio crowned Sheela Mae Santarin as Binibining Pilipinas International 1993.

The pageant also awarded two special titles in the earlier part of the pageant. Ruffa Gutierrez, 1992 Look of the Year Philippines, crowned Ana Maria Gonzalez as Binibining Pilipinas Look of the Year 1993, while Milagros Javelosa, Binibining Pilipinas Tourism 1990, crowned Jenette Fernando as Binibining Pilipinas Tourism 1993. Cristina Esguerra was named 1st Runner-Up and Myra Macariola was named 2nd Runner-Up.

Results
Color keys
  The contestant was a Finalist/Runner-up in an International pageant.
  The contestant did not place.

Special Awards

Contestants
38 contestants competed for the five titles.

Notes

Post-pageant Notes 

 Dindi Gallardo competed at Miss Universe 1993 in Mexico City and was unplaced. Sheela Santarin and Ana Gonzalez were also unplaced when they competed at Miss International 1993 and in the Elite Model Look of the Year 1993, respectively.
 Ruffa Gutierrez was named Second Runner-Up when she competed at Miss World 1993 in Sun City, South Africa.
 Karen Sanz Espino competed in Mutya ng Pilipinas 1994, where she was crowned Mutya-Queen of the Clubs International 1995. She was also awarded Best in Swimsuit during the contest. Eventually, Espino was named First Runner-Up at the Queen of the Clubs 1995 pageant.

References 

Beauty pageants in the Philippines
Philippines
Philippines
Women in the Philippines
1993